Queen Elizabeth's Hunting Lodge is a Grade II* listed former hunting lodge, now a museum, on the edge of Epping Forest, at 8 Rangers Road, Chingford, London E4, in the London Borough of Waltham Forest, near Greater London's boundary with Essex.

History
In 1542, Henry VIII commissioned the building, then known as Great Standing, from which to view the deer chase at Chingford; it was completed in 1543. The building was renovated in 1589 for Queen Elizabeth I. The former lodge, now a three-storey building, has been extensively restored and is now a museum, which has been managed by the City of London Corporation since 1960. Admission is free.

There is a smaller hunting lodge, "The Little Standing", about a mile away in Loughton, part of the Warren, the Epping Forest HQ.

References

External links

 City of London – Queen Elizabeth's Hunting Lodge

1542 establishments in England
16th-century architecture in England
Buildings and structures completed in 1543
Buildings and structures in Epping Forest District
Buildings and structures in the London Borough of Waltham Forest
Chingford
City of London Corporation
Grade II* listed buildings in the London Borough of Waltham Forest
Grade II* listed museum buildings
Historic house museums in London
Hunting lodges in England
Museums in the London Borough of Waltham Forest
Elizabeth I